Morus (Margar) Stepani Hasratyan  (Armenian: Մորուս Հասրաթյան, September 10, 1902 – February 25, 1979), was an Armenian historian, philologist, associate member at the Armenian National Academy of Sciences (in 1963), honored figure in science of Armenian Soviet Socialist Republic (ASSR)  (in 1961), and director of the History Museum of Armenia (from 1964–1975). He is the father of Murad Hasratyan.

Biography

Morus Hasratyan, an Armenian historian, philologist and an associate member at national academy of Sciences of Armenia was born on September 10, 1902 in the village of Akhlatyan in the Syunik region of Armenia. He received his primary education in parish schools in the village of Akhlatyan and Lor, and then continued his studies at Baku Trade College. During his student years, he followed Stepan Shahumyan, Sergo Orjonikidze and other revolutionaries. Between 1918–1920 he participated in the Baku commune, revolutionary and inter ethnic movements of the north Caucasus. After returning to his  birthplace in 1920, he actively took part in the Zangezur revolutionary movements. He was pursued by dashnaks on multiple occasions.

In 1922–1924, he studied at Yerevan State University in the history-philological department, where he observed  the Armenian writers Manuk Abeghyan, Hrachia Adjarian, Hakob Manandyan, Leo (Arakel Babakhanian) and others. In 1925–1927, he was assigned by the Communist Party to establish the Komsomol organizations of Sisian, Goris and Dilijan regions. In 1930 he graduated from the university and was sent to Leningrad to continue studies as a postgraduate.

During these years, under the leadership of Nicholas Marr and Joseph Orbeli, he became deeply involved in Armenology and studied the achievements of Russian science and culture.

He died on February 25, 1979 (aged 75).

Career

After the postgraduate studies, he returned to Yerevan in 1932. In 1933–1935 he was the deputy director in the History and Material Culture Institute. In 1934–1936 he was the director of the Revolution museum.

He compiled and published documents and collections of memoirs, and a single volume memoir of the May revolution of Suren Spandaryan. In 1937 he was appointed director of Matenadaran, and in 1964–75 director of National History Museum of Armenia. He lectured in the institutes of Yerevan. In 1965–1966 he lectured at  Haigazian University in Beirut, Lebanon.

Research works by Morus Hasratyan in 1940 were on architecture, archeology, philology, and the history of ancient and medieval centuries of Armenian nation.

In 1940–1941 he worked in the Monuments preservation committee and took part in the architectural and archaeological research and renovation of Avan a famous sixth century cathedral.

In 1942–1946 he worked in the Institute of Literature, engaged with philology issues. He also worked as a scientific secretary in the Social Sciences of the newly established National Academy of Sciences of Armenia. In 1947, Hasratyan was an employee of Institute of History in the National Academy of Sciences and worked there for ten years. In 1950 he participated in the archeological works of Garni, at the same time he led the archeological excavations of Zangezur.

In 1947 Hasratyan studied ancient monuments of Armenia. He explored the Tsitsernavank three dimensional basilica, and revealed its pivotal role in the design of Armenian architecture.

In the field of the history of Armenian architecture, the results of his long-term works were summarized in the book Armenian Monuments from Prehistorical Period to 17th Century, published in 1975 in Beirut, written by V. Harutyunyan (in Armenian, French and English language).

From 1964–1975 he was the director of the History Museum of Armenia. During these years the museum received international recognition.  Armenian Culture was presented at Paris, Kraków, Budapest, Talin exhibitions.

Contacts were established with Armenian Diasporan Centers.

With donations from the Diasporan Armenians the collections in the museum were complemented by unique samples of applied art from different historical-ethnographic regions of Armenia.

Hasratyan was the first author of the school textbook the History of Armenian people. He has also been the author of research on Armenian history, archeology, architecture and philology.

He participated in the establishment of collective works on historiography.

He translated Sayat Nova's non-Armenian games into Armenian, composed, edited and published Sayat Nova's collection of works with the annotations (1963)

"Syunyats Yerkir" magazine dedicated one of the issues of the magazine to  Morus Hasratyan. The presentation was held in March 2019;

References 

1902 births
1979 deaths
20th-century Armenian historians
Yerevan State Medical University alumni
Academic staff of Haigazian University
People from Syunik Province
People from Elizavetpol Governorate